First Methodist Episcopal Church of Avon, also known as Avon United Methodist Church, is a historic Methodist Episcopal church located at Avon in Livingston County, New York.  It was designed by Rochester architect James Goold Cutler and built in 1879.  It is a three- by five-bay Romanesque style brick building. The principal elevation is flanked by an engaged tower at the south end and low pavilion and chimney on the north. The center of the principal elevation is accented by a large recessed round arch at the upper level that contains a large center oculus window flanked by two small vertical windows.

It was listed on the National Register of Historic Places in 2005.

References

External links
Avon United Methodist Church website

Churches on the National Register of Historic Places in New York (state)
Methodist churches in New York (state)
Romanesque Revival church buildings in New York (state)
Churches completed in 1879
19th-century Episcopal church buildings
Churches in Livingston County, New York
National Register of Historic Places in Livingston County, New York